David Ferrer was the defending champion, but lost in the semifinals to Tommy Robredo.

Thirds-seeded Tommy Robredo won in the final 6–4, 6–1, against fourth-seeded Tomáš Berdych.

Seeds
The top four seeds receive a bye into the second round.

Draw

Finals

Top half

Bottom half

External links
Draw
Qualifying draw

Singles
2008 ATP Tour